B.D. College, Patna, also known as Bhuwaneshwari Dayal College, established in 1970, is a general degree college in Patna, Bihar. It is a constituent unit of Patliputra University. College offers undergraduate courses in Science, Commerce and Arts.
B.D. College, Patna is located at 25.60.E longitude and 85.13’ N latitude. This institution had a modest start on the 10th March 1970 and it remained under Magadh University, Bodh Gaya in (1970-2018) presently it is under Patliputra University, Patna since the 18th March 2018. Immediately Area of the campus is about 26 katha this college is situated in the Heart of Patna the Capital of Bihar.
It is managed as per provisions of the University Acts and Statutes prescribed by the UGC and promulgated by the State Government of Bihar with Governor cum Chancellor of the Universities of Bihar as its highest authority. Principal is the highest administrative authority in the college. The college receives grants from the state government as well as the University Grants Commission for the payment of salary and infrastructural development.
The college follows the policy of collective decision making. In order to maintain academic, administrative and financial disciplines and tone up the internal set up of various internal committees are functioning.
For fostering civic and social values among the students interactive sessions, outreaching activities and field study in surrounding areas are organised by the departments. Issues concerning health, environment & culture, social and political awareness have also been inculcated.
The Internal Quality Assurance Cell has been created with sixteen senior faculty members, government representatives, Bursar, C.C.D.C., senior alumnus and Principal as the Chairman of the cell along with teacher nominated by NAAC Steering Committee. The cell monitors the quality of teaching, research activities, co and extracurricular programme undertaken by different departments and Societies/ Committees of the college.
The teachers of the college frequently attend Orientation and Refresher Courses to update their knowledge and skill. Some of the teachers participate in Orientation and Refresher Courses as resource persons, academic council senate in different universities some our teachers are engaged in Union Public Services commission and Bihar public Services Commission.

Departments

Science

Chemistry
Physics
Mathematics
Zoology
Botany

Arts & Commerce 

English
Hindi
Urdu
Sanskrit
Prakrit
Maithili
Economics
Political Science
Philosophy
History
Geography
Ancient Indian History & Archeology
Psychology
Commerce

Accreditation
B.D. College, Patna was accredited by the National Assessment and Accreditation Council (NAAC) with 'B' grade.

References

External links
Official website of college

Constituent colleges of Patliputra University
Universities and colleges in Bihar
Educational institutions established in 1970
Universities and colleges in Patna
1970 establishments in Bihar